

2012

See also
 2012 in Australia
 2012 in Australian television
 List of 2012 box office number-one films in Australia

2012
Australia
Films